"This Groove" is a song by British singer-songwriter Victoria Beckham. It was released as a double A-side with "Let Your Head Go". It was intended for Beckham's next album, but her record company Telstar Records went bankrupt before it surfaced. In 2004, it was included on the video album The 'Réal' Beckhams. The song samples and interpolates the melody of The System's "Don't Disturb This Groove".

Background
In 2002, Beckham signed a contract with Telstar Records and 19 Management worth £1.5 million. Beckham then began recording a pop-influenced album, Open Your Eyes, which yielded the single "Let Your Head Go", but she allegedly chose not to release the album after being disappointed with the results. Instead of pop, Beckham wanted a more urban sound and worked with urban producer Damon Dash to work on the R&B and hip hop-influenced album Come Together. A Dash-produced track, "It's That Simple" featuring M.O.P., premiered on radio stations in July 2003, generating mixed reviews. 

Beckham's first single with Telstar, "This Groove"/"Let Your Head Go", was released in the UK on 29 December 2003 following heavy promotion and many TV appearances across the Christmas period. The double A-side lifted "Let Your Head Go" from Beckham's earlier pop-inspired work with "This Groove" one of her R&B songs, and remains Beckham's last single release to date. Outside of the UK, Damon Dash had plans for Beckham in the US, including a potential release of "This Groove / Let Your Head Go" under the name of "Posh Spice Victoria Beckham". The release was proposed for sometime between March to May 2004, but never eventuated.

With the UK media describing her solo music career a failure, combined with a rumoured fall-out between Dash and Fuller, her hip hop album, Come Together, was not released. She was dismissed from Telstar when the company became bankrupt, and gave up music to focus her fashion career.

Chart performance
The single entered the UK Singles Chart at and peaked at number three, charting for 8 weeks. This was the highest new entry for the week, and also tied with Emma Bunton's "Downtown" as the highest chart position for a solo Spice Girl since Geri Halliwell's "It's Raining Men" topped the chart in 2001. It became the UK's 88th-best-selling single of 2004. Like "Out of Your Mind", this track was released in the same week as a Sophie Ellis-Bextor single, this time being "I Won't Change You", which reached number nine.

Track listings
 UK CD
 "This Groove"  – 3:36
 "Let Your Head Go"  – 3:41

 UK CD2
 "Let Your Head Go"  – 7:20
 "This Groove"  – 4:36
 "Let Your Head Go"  – 3:33
 "This Groove"  – 3:37

Charts
All entries charted with "Let Your Head Go".

Weekly charts

Year-end chart

References

2003 songs
2004 singles
Songs written by David Conley (musician)
Songs written by David Frank (musician)
Songs written by Mic Murphy
Telstar Records singles
Victoria Beckham songs